St. Joseph's Home is a historic Roman Catholic orphanage on Camp Robinson Road in North Little Rock, Arkansas.  It is a large three-story brick building, with a tile hip roof and a stone foundation.  The roof is topped by a cupola with a cross as a spire.  The building is roughly H-shaped, with projecting wings on either side of central section.  It has eighty bedrooms.  It was built in 1910 by the Roman Catholic Diocese of Little Rock.

The facility was listed on the National Register of Historic Places in 1976.

See also
National Register of Historic Places listings in Pulaski County, Arkansas

References

Residential buildings on the National Register of Historic Places in Arkansas
Residential buildings completed in 1908
Buildings and structures in North Little Rock, Arkansas
1908 establishments in Arkansas
National Register of Historic Places in Pulaski County, Arkansas
Roman Catholic Diocese of Little Rock
Orphanages in the United States